The Tunga River (alternatively spelled Thunga) is a river in Karnataka state, southern India. The river is born in the Western Ghats on a hill known as Varaha Parvata at a place called Gangamoola. From here, the river flows through two districts in Karnataka -  Chikmagalur District and Shimoga District. It is 147 km long and merges with the Bhadra River at Koodli, a small town near Shimoga City, Karnataka. The river is given the compound name Tungabhadra from this point on. The Tungabhadra flows eastwards and merges with the Krishna River in Andhra Pradesh.

It has a dam built across it at Gajanur, and a larger dam has been built across the compound Tungabhadra river at Hospet.

Religious centres
Sringeri, on the banks of the Tunga, has several temples, the most important being the Śhāradā temple and the Vidyāśhankara temple. Hariharapura is another religious centre on the bank of Tunga river in the Chikkamagalurur district.

See also 
 Netravati river
 Mangalore
 Sharavati river
 Linganamakki Dam

Rivers of Karnataka
Rivers of India